Bartlett School may refer to:

 Academy at Palumbo, historic school building in Philadelphia, Pennsylvania, formerly known as Bartlett School
 The Bartlett, the Faculty of the Built Environment at University College London
 Bartlett School of Architecture
 Bartlett School of Planning
 Bartlett School of Construction and Project Management

See also
 Bartlett (disambiguation)
 Bartlett High School (disambiguation)